Annise Bradfield (born 9 December 2002) is an Australian rules footballer who played for Gold Coast in the AFL Women's competition (AFLW).

Early life
Bradfield grew up on the Gold Coast and was a high level field hockey in her younger years. At the age of 12, her neighbour convinced her to begin playing Australian rules football for the Labrador Tigers. A year later Bradfield switched clubs to the Southport Sharks where she became an outstanding junior prospect. She switched to the Bond University Football Club in her final year of junior football in order to compete in the top level QAFLW competition.

Bradfield attended Southport State High School throughout her upbringing and was taught P.E. by future Suns teammate Jamie Stanton.

AFLW career
Bradfield made her AFLW debut for Gold Coast in Round 1 of the 2021 AFLW season.

In March 2023, Bradfield was delisted by Gold Coast, having played five matches while coping with a knee injury.

References

2002 births
Living people
Sportspeople from the Gold Coast, Queensland
Sportswomen from Queensland
Australian rules footballers from Queensland
Gold Coast Football Club (AFLW) players